Expert Review of Respiratory Medicine is a bimonthly peer-reviewed medical journal covering pulmonology. It was established in 2007 and is published by Taylor & Francis. According to the Journal Citation Reports, the journal has a 2016 impact factor of 2.432.

References

External links

Pulmonology journals
Expert Review journals
Bimonthly journals
Publications established in 2007
English-language journals